Ciceritol is a cyclitol. It is a pinitol digalactoside that can be isolated from seeds of chickpea, lentil and white lupin.

References 

Cyclitols
Galactosides